Guzmania rosea is a plant species in the genus Guzmania. This species is native to Colombia and Ecuador.

References

rosea
Flora of Ecuador
Flora of Colombia
Plants described in 1933